Tomáš Káňa (born November 29, 1987) is a Czech professional ice hockey player currently playing for Milton Keynes Lightning in the National Ice Hockey League (NIHL).

Playing career
Káňa, a center, played two seasons in the Czech Extraliga with HC Vítkovice before being drafted 31st overall by the St. Louis Blues in the 2006 NHL Entry Draft. On May 23, 2007, Káňa was signed to a three-year entry level contract with the Blues. Káňa spent the majority of his contract with the Blues' second tier affiliate, the Alaska Aces of the ECHL.

On December 8, 2009, Tomas was traded by St. Louis, along with Brendan Bell, to the Columbus Blue Jackets for Pascal Pelletier. He was then assigned to AHL affiliate, Syracuse Crunch, where he scored an impressive 15 goals in 50 games. With new found confidence Káňa was recalled to the Blue Jackets at the end of the 2009–10 season and made his NHL debut in a 3-2 victory over the Tampa Bay Lightning on March 30, 2010. He later recorded his first career NHL points, both assists, in a 4-3 defeat to the Detroit Red Wings on April 7, 2010.

On June 6, 2011, Kana signed a two-year contract to return to his original Czech team HC Vitkovice.

Career statistics

Regular season and playoffs

International

References

External links

1987 births
Living people
Alaska Aces (ECHL) players
Arystan Temirtau players
Columbus Blue Jackets players
Czech ice hockey centres
HSC Csíkszereda players
LHK Jestřábi Prostějov players
HC Karlovy Vary players
EHC Klostersee players
Milton Keynes Lightning players
BK Mladá Boleslav players
HC Oceláři Třinec players
Sportspeople from Opava
Peoria Rivermen (AHL) players
Piráti Chomutov players
HC RT Torax Poruba players
HC Slovan Ústečtí Lvi players
Springfield Falcons players
St. Louis Blues draft picks
Swindon Wildcats players
Syracuse Crunch players
HC Vítkovice players
KH Zagłębie Sosnowiec players
MsHK Žilina players
Czech expatriate ice hockey players in the United States
Czech expatriate sportspeople in Poland
Expatriate ice hockey players in Poland
Czech expatriate sportspeople in Kazakhstan
Expatriate ice hockey players in Kazakhstan
Czech expatriate ice hockey players in Germany
Czech expatriate ice hockey players in Slovakia
Czech expatriate sportspeople in Romania
Expatriate ice hockey players in Romania
Czech expatriate sportspeople in England
Expatriate ice hockey players in England